The Premier League Manager of the Month is an association football award that recognises the best adjudged Premier League manager each month of the season. The winner is chosen by a combination of an online public vote, which contributes to 10% of the final tally, and a panel of experts. It has been called the Carling Premiership Manager of the Month (1993–2001) and the Barclaycard Premiership Manager of the Month (2001–2004); it is currently known as the Barclays Manager of the Month.

The Premier League was formed in 1992, when the members of the First Division resigned from the Football League. These clubs set up a new commercially independent league that negotiated its own broadcast and sponsorship agreements. The Premier League introduced new Manager of the Month and Manager of the Season awards for the 1993–94 season, supplementing the existing Football Writers' Association and Professional Footballers' Association Player of the Year awards. The first Manager of the Month was awarded to Manchester United manager Alex Ferguson for his achievements in August 1993. For the 1994–95 season, the Premier League introduced the Player of the Month award, which is presented alongside the Manager of the Month award.

Ferguson has been Manager of the Month the most times with a record 27 awards. Harry Redknapp has had six spells managing Premier League clubs (West Ham United, Portsmouth, Southampton, Portsmouth again, Tottenham Hotspur and Queens Park Rangers), winning a Manager of the Month award in five of those spells. Fifteen other managers have won an award with two or more clubs: Gordon Strachan with Coventry City and Southampton, Stuart Pearce with Nottingham Forest and Manchester City, Martin O'Neill with Leicester City, Aston Villa and Sunderland, Roy Hodgson with Blackburn Rovers and Fulham, Rafael Benítez with Liverpool, Chelsea and Newcastle United, Brendan Rodgers with Swansea City and Liverpool, Alan Pardew with West Ham United and Newcastle United, Sam Allardyce with Bolton Wanderers and West Ham United, Tony Pulis with Crystal Palace and West Bromwich Albion, Mauricio Pochettino with Southampton and Tottenham Hotspur, Claudio Ranieri with Chelsea and Leicester City, Carlo Ancelotti with Chelsea and Everton, José Mourinho with Chelsea and Tottenham Hotspur, Nuno Espírito Santo with Wolverhampton Wanderers and Tottenham Hotspur, and Eddie Howe with Bournemouth and Newcastle United.

The award has been won in consecutive months by 16 managers: Joe Kinnear, Kevin Keegan, Roy Evans, Alex Ferguson, Arsène Wenger, David O'Leary, Stuart Pearce, Paul Jewell, Rafael Benítez, Carlo Ancelotti, Manuel Pellegrini, Claudio Ranieri, Antonio Conte, Pep Guardiola, Jürgen Klopp, and Mikel Arteta. Guardiola is the only manager in Premier League history to have won the award in four successive months. Klopp is the first manager to win the award five times in a season. The award has been shared on one occasion, in March 2002, when Liverpool manager Gérard Houllier was jointly awarded Manager of the Month with caretaker manager Phil Thompson, who had deputised while Houllier was absent for medical reasons.

, the most recent recipient of the award is Manchester United manager Erik ten Hag.

Key
Managers marked  shared the award with another manager.

List of winners

Multiple winners

Awards won by nationality

Awards won by club

Notes

References
General
 Individual seasons accessed via drop-down list.

Specific

Manager of the Month
Coaching awards
Lists of Premier League managers